Urgleptes clarkei is a species of beetle in the family Cerambycidae. It was described by Chemsak in 1966.

References

Urgleptes
Beetles described in 1966